Blejoi is a commune in Prahova County, Muntenia, Romania. It is composed of three villages: Blejoi, Ploieștiori, and Țânțăreni.

Natives
 Geo Bogza (1908–1993), avant-garde theorist, poet, and journalist
 Constantin Dimitrescu (1847–1928), classic composer and music teacher
 Alec Sehon (1924–2018), immunologist
 Radu Tudoran (1910–1992), born Nicolae Bogza (brother of Geo), novelist

References

Blejoi
Localities in Muntenia